Narita is an unincorporated community in Logan County, Illinois, United States. Narita is located on Illinois Route 121, southeast of Mount Pulaski. It was the host community of the former University of Illinois Agricultural Extension 4H Club, "Narita Ag".

References

Unincorporated communities in Logan County, Illinois
Unincorporated communities in Illinois